Ruslaan Mumtaz (born 2 August 1982) is an Indian film and television actor. He made his Bollywood debut in 2007 with MP3: Mera Pehla Pehla Pyaar. In 2013, he made his television debut with the role of Dhruv in Kehta Hai Dil Jee Le Zara. In 2019, he appeared in Season 3 of the web series A.I.SHA My Virtual Girlfriend as Sam, a genius coder responsible for creating the world's most advanced artificially intelligent simulated humanoid assistant.

He is the son of Marathi actress Anjana Mumtaz.

Filmography

Films

Web series

Television

References

External links
 
 

1982 births
Living people
Indian male models
Indian male film actors
Indian male television actors
Male actors in Hindi cinema